Chloe Kay Coscarelli (born October 14, 1987) is a vegan chef and author.

Early life and education
Chloe Kay Coscarelli is the daughter of filmmaker Don Coscarelli. She is a graduate of UC Berkeley, where she discovered her love for cooking.

Career
A summer internship at Millenniu], a gourmet vegan restaurant located in San Francisco, led to a course of study at the Natural Gourmet Institute in New York City. Coscarelli was a contestant in Cupcake Wars, her vegan cupcakes garnering her first prize. She became the first vegan to win a culinary competition on television and was named to the 2017 Class of 30 Under 30 by Forbes.

Since 2020, Whole Foods has partnered with Coscarelli, who creates prepared vegan holiday meals for Thanksgiving. 

In 2022, Club Med also partnered with Coscarelli to add vegan meals "at all eight of its all-inclusive resorts in Mexico and the Caribbean."

By Chloe
In mid-2015, Coscarelli partnered with ESquared Hospitality to open the vegan fast casual restaurant By Chloe (stylized by CHLOE) on Bleecker Street in the West Village of New York City. By 2017 the chain comprised five locations in Brooklyn and Manhattan, with additional locations in Los Angeles, Providence, and Boston. In July 2017, Coscarelli was forced out by ESquared in an arbitration award after she filed suit in 2016 over control of the company. In December 2020, By Chloe filed for bankruptcy. 

In 2021, it was acquired by "a consortium of investors that already had stakes in the company," and rebranded as "Beatnic."

Works
In 2012, she published her first cookbook, Chloe's Kitchen, followed by Chloe's Vegan Desserts in 2013, Chloe's Vegan Italian Kitchen in 2014, and Chloe Flavor in 2018.

References

External links 
 
Make Chloe Coscarelli’s mac and greens- Today, April 22, 2021.

1987 births
21st-century American women
American chefs
American veganism activists
Chefs of vegan cuisine
Living people
Writers from Los Angeles
Reality cooking competition winners
University of California, Berkeley alumni
American cookbook writers
Women cookbook writers
American women non-fiction writers
Vegan cookbook writers